The 2005–06 Luxembourg National Division was the 92nd season of top level association football in Luxembourg. The competition ran from 7 August 2005 to 28 May 2006.  The league title was won by F91 Dudelange, who also won the Luxembourg Cup to complete the Double.

Teams

The 2005–06 season saw the National Division's roster of twelve clubs include:
FC Avenir Beggen
F91 Dudelange (the reigning champions)
FC Etzella Ettelbruck
CS Grevenmacher
Jeunesse Esch
UN Käerjeng 97 (promoted from the Division of Honour)
CS Pétange
Racing FC Union Luxembourg
US Rumelange (promoted from the Division of Honour)
FC Swift Hesperange
FC Victoria Rosport
FC Wiltz 71

Format
The twelve teams completed the round-robin by playing each other twice (once home and once away) by 2 April.  Then, the league divided into three.  The top four teams were separated from the rest and formed the  'Title group' .  The bottom eight teams were then subdivided into two groups of four, titled  'Relegation group A'  and  'Relegation group B' .  In the event, the top four were F91 Dudelange, Jeunesse Esch, FC Etzella Ettelbruck, and CS Grevenmacher.

In each of the three mini-leagues, each team played each of the three other teams in the mini-league twice (once home and once away).  To these results were added the 22 results of the first stage.  The overall points totals (and goal difference, etc.) were used to determine each club's position in its respective mini-league.

After calculating the final results after 28 games, F91 Dudelange, the top team in the title group, was declared the league champion.  The fourth-placed team in each of the relegation groups (US Rumelange and FC Avenir Beggen in groups A and B respectively) played off against the third- and fourth-placed teams in Luxembourg's second division (FC Mondercange and FC Mamer 32), the Division of Honour.  The winning team in each tie was awarded a place in the National Division in the 2006-07 season, whilst the losing team was confined to the second division.  The matches were played on 28 May on neutral ground.  Both National Division teams lost, thus were relegated.

2005-06 was the last season to use this format.  From 2006 to 2007, a simple league round-robin will be used for the entire season.

European qualification
Luxembourg was assigned one spot in the first qualifying round of the UEFA Champions League, for the league champions; it was also assigned two spots in the first qualifying round of the UEFA Cup, for the runners-up and the winners of the Luxembourg Cup.  As league champions, F91 Dudelange qualified for the Champions League.  Jeunesse Esch qualified for the UEFA Cup as runners-up.  In addition, as F91 Dudelange and Jeunesse Esch contested the Luxembourg Cup final, the UEFA Cup assigned to the cup winners went to FC Etzella Ettelbruck, who finished third in the league.

First phase

Table

Results

Second phase

Championship stage

Table

Results

Relegation stage

Group A

Table

Results

Group B

Table

Results

Relegation play-offs

Top goalscorers

Team changes for 2006-07 season
After the 2005–06 season ended, the league was expanded from twelve teams to fourteen.  The champions and runners-up of the Division of Honour, FC Differdange 03 and FC Progrès Niedercorn, were promoted automatically.  After losing their relegation play-offs, Avenir Beggen and US Rumelange were relegated and replaced by FC Mondercange and FC Mamer 32.

References 

Luxembourg National Division seasons
Luxembourg National Division, 2005-06
1